Peggy Little (born August 8, 1942) is an American country music singer best remembered for her country cover version of Dusty Springfield's "Son of a Preacher Man".

Early years
Little was born in  Marlin, Texas and raised in Waco, Texas. She began her career as a vocalist on a Waco radio station when she was 11 years old.

Career
In the late 1960s and early 1970s, Little was a well-known figure to country music audiences with several charting records and multiple appearances on country music programs such as Hee Haw.  She also made guest appearances on The Mike Douglas Show, Wilburn Brothers Show, Bill Anderson Show, Del Reeves Show, and The Ralph Emery Show.

Little recorded for Dot Records and later was on the Epic Records label.  Little left the music industry in the mid-1970s and has not sung professionally in decades. She currently resides in her native Texas.

Personal life
Little married when she was 16 and left show business to raise a family. That situation ended with a divorce in 1965.

Discography

Albums

Singles

References

1942 births
American country singer-songwriters
American women country singers
Dot Records artists
Epic Records artists
People from Waco, Texas
Living people
Singer-songwriters from Texas
Country musicians from Texas
21st-century American women